Louisiana elected its member July 6–8, 1818.

Louisiana held an election for the 16th Congress at the same time that it held a special election to finish the 15th Congress. Data were only available for the special election, but the general election would presumably have had very similar results, and so the results for the special election are duplicated here.

See also 
 1818 Louisiana's at-large congressional district special election
 1818 and 1819 United States House of Representatives elections
 List of United States representatives from Louisiana

Notes

References 

1818
Louisiana
United States House of Representatives